Karkas may refer to:

Karkas Mountains, mountain range of Iran
Karkas, Iran, a village in Iran
Karkas Rural District, in Iran
Karkas (comics), a fictional Marvel Comics character
Monastery of Al-Karkas, monastery of Egypt